Synoicum is a genus of colonial sea squirts, tunicates in the family Polyclinidae.

Species
The World Register of Marine Species lists the following species :

Synoicum adareanum (Herdman, 1902)
Synoicum angustum Kott, 1992
Synoicum apectetum Millar, 1982
Synoicum arenaceum (Michaelsen, 1924)
Synoicum atlanticum Millar, 1968
Synoicum atopogaster Kott, 1963
Synoicum australe Millar, 1962
Synoicum beauchampi (Harant, 1927)
Synoicum blochmanni (Heiden, 1894)
Synoicum bowerbanki Millar, 1963
Synoicum buccinum Kott, 1992
Synoicum calypsonis (Peres, 1956)
Synoicum capense Millar, 1962
Synoicum castellatum Kott, 1992
Synoicum chrysanthemum Kott, 1992
Synoicum citrum Kott, 1992
Synoicum clavatum (Oka, 1927)
Synoicum concavitum Kott, 1992
Synoicum cymosum Redikorzev, 1927
Synoicum daucum Monniot C. & Monniot F., 1977
Synoicum derjugini Redikorzev, 1927
Synoicum diaphanum Sluiter, 1927
Synoicum duboscqui (Harant, 1927)
Synoicum erectum Kott, 1992
Synoicum floriferum Monniot & Monniot, 2006
Synoicum galei (Michaelsen, 1930)
Synoicum georgianum Sluiter, 1932
Synoicum haurakiensis Brewin, 1951
Synoicum herdmani Brewin, 1956
Synoicum howeni Monniot & Monniot, 1988
Synoicum hypurgon (Michaelsen, 1924)
Synoicum implicatum Kott, 2008
Synoicum incrustatum (Sars, 1851)
Synoicum insulsum (Sluiter, 1898)
Synoicum intercedens (Sluiter, 1909)
Synoicum irregulare Ritter, 1899
Synoicum jordani (Ritter, 1899)
Synoicum kerguelenense (Hartmeyer, 1911)
Synoicum kincaidi (Ritter, 1899)
Synoicum kuranui Brewin, 1950
Synoicum laboutei F. Monniot & C. Monniot, 2006
Synoicum lacazei (Pérès, 1957)
Synoicum longistriatum Kott, 1992
Synoicum macroglossum (Hartmeyer, 1919)
Synoicum molle (Herdman, 1886)
Synoicum obscurum Kott, 1992
Synoicum occidentalis Millar, 1982
Synoicum ostentor Monniot & Monniot, 1983
Synoicum otagoensis Millar, 1982
Synoicum papilliferum (Michaelsen, 1930)
Synoicum parfustis (Ritter & Forsyth, 1917)
Synoicum partitionis Monniot, 1987
Synoicum parvum Redikorzev, 1937
Synoicum pellucens Redikorzev, 1927
Synoicum pellucidum (Ritter & Forsyth, 1917)
Synoicum pererratum (Sluiter, 1912)
Synoicum polygyna C. Monniot & F. Monniot, 1980
Synoicum pomum (Sars, 1851)
Synoicum pribilovense (Ritter, 1899)
Synoicum prunum (Herdman, 1899)
Synoicum pseudogrisiatum Kott, 2008
Synoicum pulmonaria (Ellis & Solander, 1786)
Synoicum ramulosum Kott, 1969
Synoicum rapum Kott, 2008
Synoicum sabuliferum Redikorzev, 1937
Synoicum sacculum Kott, 1992
Synoicum sagamianum Tokioka, 1962
Synoicum salivum Monniot & Gaill, 1978
Synoicum saxeum Kott, 1998
Synoicum senegalense (Peres, 1949)
Synoicum solidum Redikorzev, 1937
Synoicum sphinctorum Kott, 2006
Synoicum stewartense (Michaelsen, 1924)
Synoicum suarenum Kott, 1992
Synoicum syrtis Kott, 2006
Synoicum tentaculatum Kott, 1969
Synoicum triplex (Sluiter, 1906)
Synoicum tropicum (Sluiter, 1909)
Synoicum turgens Phipps, 1774
Synoicum vesica Kott, 2008
Synoicum vibei Lützen, 1959

References

Aplousobranchia
Tunicate genera
Taxa named by Constantine Phipps, 2nd Baron Mulgrave